The following is a list of Radio Disney Music Award winners and nominees for Catchiest New Song.

Winners and nominees

2010s

References

Catchiest New Song
Song awards